U of W may refer to:

 University of Wollongong, a university in Australia
 University of Waterloo, a university in Canada
 University of Winnipeg, a university in Canada
 University of Windsor, a university in Canada
 University of Wuppertal (Universität Wuppertal), a university in Germany
 University of Würzburg, a university in Germany
 University of Warsaw (Uniwersytet Warszawski), a university in Poland
 University of Washington, a university in the United States
 University of Wisconsin–Madison, a university in the United States
 University of Wisconsin System, a university in the United States
 University of Wyoming, a university in the United States

See also
 UW (disambiguation)